Carlos Eduardo Bleck was a sailor from Portugal, who represented his country at the 1928 Summer Olympics in Amsterdam, Netherlands.

Sources 
 

Sailors at the 1928 Summer Olympics – 6 Metre
Olympic sailors of Portugal
1903 births
1975 deaths
Portuguese male sailors (sport)